The Hanover Hound is a breed of dog sometimes referred to as a Hanoverian Hound. It is a hunting and tracking dog descended from bloodhounds of medieval times. It was first introduced into France in the 1980s and is still a very rare breed. It was crossbred with the Bavarian Hound, which gave rise to the Bavarian Mountain Hound.

Description

Appearance
These short-haired dogs range in colour from light to dark reddish fawn with a brindled appearance. They may also have a mask. Overall, the Hanoverian Hound is sturdily built with a large head, strong jaws and a deep chest.

Temperament 
Like any working dog, the Hanover Hound fares best living in an area where he can exercise and would not be ideal for city living. They are calm and loyal, but described as persistent and single-minded when tracking.

See also
 Dogs portal
 List of dog breeds

References

External links

German Hannover'scher Schweisshund Club
Hanoverian Hound Foto Album

Dog breeds originating in Germany
FCI breeds

Rare dog breeds
Scent hounds